Preikestolen or Prekestolen is a tourist attraction in the municipality of Strand in Rogaland county, Norway. Preikestolen is located near the Western part of the fjord, and on its North side.

Tourism at the site has been increasing in the early 21st century, with between 150,000 and 200,000 visitors in 2012, making it one of the most visited natural tourist attractions in Norway. BASE jumpers often leap from the cliff.

Name
The name Prekestolen (without the i) was coined around the year 1900 when the local tourist organisation, wanted to promote the site for trekking. The "i" was added later to concord with Nynorsk, the official local form of Norwegian, and the site is now known both locally and officially as "Preikestolen."

Access

Preikestolen is located in the southern part of the Ryfylke district in Rogaland county in Western Norway.

Access to Preikestolen from Stavanger is via the Norwegian National Road 13 (Rv13) and the ferry from Tau. From the south, access is by the Rv13 through Sandnes via the ferry from Lauvvika to Oanes. The road is usually open and the ferries running year-round. However, due to snow, it is not always possible to do the hike to the top in the winter.

The road to the site ends in the municipality of Strand, just south of the town of Jørpeland at a parking facility at the Preikestolen Fjellstue, with a trail extending from the parking facility to the site. A round-trip hike to Preikestolen from the closest car park takes about 3–4 hours for someone of average fitness.

The walk to Preikestolen is very steep in places. The walk takes 2–3 hours depending on traffic along the trail, experience, and fitness level. Even though the elevation differential is only  and the walk is not particularly long, about  each way, the total elevation gain and loss over the course of the hike is more than one might initially expect, as the path climbs and descends various ridges. The walk is more difficult in winter and spring when there is snow and ice.

This walk is more demanding, and takes 4–5 hours each way.

An alternative is to sail through the Lysefjorden, with trips running year-round. Outside of summer, the weather may be wet and cold, and clouds may obstruct views of the cliff. The ship stops at several small docks on the way in and out, including a layover at the end of the Lysefjorden at the village of Lysebotn.

Improvement project
In early April 2013, a project started to improve the path up to Preikestolen as the old one was so small that it often caused "delays", and at some points on the path it was sometimes impossible to get through. By 2016 the path was completed. 

In 2019 a new project started to further improve paths, new website and improvement of signs.

Safety
The authorities have opted not to install fencing or other safety devices as they felt it would detract from the site and the fact that fatalities at the site are extremely rare, despite having approximately 200,000 visitors each year. Furthermore, there were concerns that fences or other devices might encourage dangerous behavior such as climbing onto the fences. Norwegian authorities have stated that "we cannot fence in all nature in this country".

Up until 2013 there had been no accidental fatalities at the site.  However, there were previously suicides and suicide attempts. In February 2000, an Austrian woman and a Norwegian man committed a joint suicide by jumping together off the cliff after meeting on the internet and forming a suicide pact.  In October 2004, a young German couple were on their way to the cliff to commit suicide but were stopped by the Norwegian authorities before being able to carry out the act when their families alerted authorities. In autumn 2013, a Spanish tourist became the first person to die from what was originally ruled to be an accident; however, right after the accident, a suicide note was posted on his Facebook account indicating that the incident was in fact a suicide.

According to local press the first accident without known suicidal intentions had been in 2020.

Nature

Geology
The cliff was formed during the ice age, approximately 10,000 years ago, when the edges of the glacier reached the cliff. The water from the glacier froze in the crevices of the mountain and eventually broke off large, angular blocks, which were later carried away with the glacier. This is the cause of the angular shape of the plateau. Along the plateau itself there continues to be a deep crack. Due to these cracks, the plateau will at some point fall down, but all the geological investigations have revealed that this will not happen in the foreseeable future, and geologists have confirmed the safety of the plateau.

Climate
Along the fjord there is a mild and humid coastal climate.

Surrounding landscape
The cliff overlooks the valleys of the Ryfylke region. Some of the hilltops have plains which are interspersed with lakes.

Some tourists elect to forego trips to Preikestolen and go to Kjerag instead.

In popular culture 
A granite sculpture of the cliff was erected in the town Langeskov in Denmark to commemorate its twin town of Forsand.
In the final scene of the final episode of the second season of Vikings the main character, Ragnar Lothbrok, is seen sitting atop Preikestolen.
Compressed air from Lysefjorden/Preikestolen is being sold in cans, mostly to China.
The final fight scene (from 2h:10m to 2h:15m) in Mission: Impossible – Fallout features Tom Cruise climbing the face of the cliff at Preikestolen, although in the movie, it is supposed to be in Indian-administered Kashmir, now administered by India as Laddakh union territory.
A movie song called  (from 00:00m to 1:30m) from the 2011 blockbuster Tamil-language movie Ko features the lead couples dancing on the top of the cliff at Preikestolen.

Gallery

See also

 Besseggen
 De syv søstre
 Kjerag
 Kjeragbolten
 Trollgaren
 Trollstigen
 Trolltunga
 Trollveggen
 List of waterfalls

References

External links

 Preikestolen – 360* Panoramic Pictures – Virtual Norge
 Preikestolen.no
 Preikestolen365.com
 Ryfylke.com
 Preikestolen Fjellstue

Landforms of Rogaland
Cliffs of Norway
Rock formations of Norway
Strand, Norway
Tourist attractions in Norway